An airway is a part of the respiratory system through which air flows.

Airway or similar may also refer to:
Airway (automobile)
Airway (aviation), an aerial route taken by airplanes
Airway (band), a musical ensemble based within the Los Angeles Free Music Society
Air Ways, an Australian television series
"The Airway", a song by Owl City from Of June
The main ventilation artery in underground mine ventilation

See also
Jetway, an airport air bridge
Flyway, an aerial route taken by migrating birds
Flyway (disambiguation)
Skyway (disambiguation)
Flightpath (disambiguation)